Donald Barnard Cole (March 31, 1922 – October 5, 2013), born in Lawrence, Massachusetts, was professor emeritus at Phillips Exeter Academy, New Hampshire, and the author of books on early American history, including Martin Van Buren and the American Political System and The Presidency of Andrew Jackson.

Cole was married to Susan Wilson, with whom he had four children: Douglas, Robert, Daniel, and Susan. Cole died on October 5, 2013, in Exeter, New Hampshire.

He graduated from Phillips Academy and Harvard University in 1944. He served in the Navy during World War II. He served as a lieutenant on a landing craft in the Pacific Theater, including the invasions of Okinawa and Guam.

Published works

Immigrant City: Lawrence, Massachusetts, 1845-1921. Chapel Hill, NC: UNC Press, 1963/2002. 
Jacksonian Democracy in New Hampshire, 1800-1851. Cambridge, Mass.: Harvard University Press, 1970. 
A Jackson Man: Amos Kendall and the Rise of American Democracy. Baton Rouge: Louisiana State University Press, 2004. 
Martin Van Buren and the American Political System. Princeton, N.J.: Princeton University Press, 1984. 
The Presidency of Andrew Jackson. Lawrence, Kan.: University Press of Kansas, 1993. 
Vindicating Andrew Jackson: The 1828 Election and the Rise of the Two-Party System. Baton Rouge: Louisiana State University Press, 2009. ISBN 0-7006-1661-9
Witness to the Young Republic: A Yankee's Journal, 1828-1870 (with Benjamin B. French & John J. McDonough). Hanover, NH: University Press of New England, 1989.

References

1922 births
2013 deaths
American biographers
American male biographers
American historians
Harvard University alumni
Phillips Exeter Academy faculty
United States Navy officers
United States Navy personnel of World War II